The Kaveri (also known as Cauvery, the anglicized name) is one of the major Indian rivers flowing through the states of Karnataka and Tamil Nadu. The Kaveri river rises at Talakaveri in the Brahmagiri range in the Western Ghats, Kodagu district of the state of Karnataka, at an elevation of 1,341 m above mean sea level and flows for about 800 km before its outfall into the Bay of Bengal. It reaches the sea in Poompuhar in Mayiladuthurai district. It is the third largest river  after Godavari and Krishna  in southern India, and the largest in the State of Tamil Nadu, which, on its course, bisects the state into north and south. In ancient Tamil literature, the river was also called Ponni (the golden maid, in reference to the fine silt it deposits).

The Kaveri is a sacred river to the people of South India and is worshipped as the Goddess Kaveriamma (Mother Cauvery). It is considered to be among the seven holy rivers of India. It is extensively used for agriculture in both Karnataka and Tamil Nadu.

The catchment area of the Kaveri basin is estimated to be  with many tributaries including Harangi, Hemavati, Kabini, Bhavani, Lakshmana Tirtha, Noyyal and Arkavati. The river basin covers three states and a Union Territory as follows: Tamil Nadu, ; Karnataka, ; Kerala, and Puducherry, . The river is the source for an extensive irrigation system and for hydroelectric power. The river has supported irrigated agriculture for centuries and served as the lifeblood of the ancient kingdoms and modern cities of southern India. Access to the river's waters has pitted Indian states against each other for decades. It was profusely described in the Tamil Sangam literature and is held in great reverence in Hinduism. The Kaveri river delta is a thickly populated delta, one which is frequently affected by tropical cyclones formed in the Bay of Bengal.

Etymology

Dravidian
The etymology of the river was derived from the Sankethi word for "river", ಕಾವೇರಿ காவிரி (kāviri), as this is the major river for the Sankethi people that live along its waters. The word is from the Dravidian/Tamil root words "ka" and "viri", "கா" and "விரி", which roughly translates to "branching into fields/forests", due to the river's multiple divergences in the delta region.

Sanskrit
Marudvṛdhā is another hypothesized name for this river, meaning "the beloved of the Maruts". However, this is unlikely as Marudvrdhā is also identified with a river in Punjab.

Epithets 
The Kaveri River is also known as Daksina Ganga, the "Ganges of the South" and Kaveri Amman when worshipped as a river goddess. In ancient Tamil literature, the river was also called Ponni (the golden maid, in reference to the fine silt it deposits).

Course 
The Kaveri River is a perennial, monsoon rain fed river. It rises at Talakaveri, located in the Kodagu district in the Indian state of Karnataka. After the river leaves the Kodagu hills it flows onto the Deccan plateau and forms two islands, Srirangapatna and Sivasamudram. At Shivanasamudra the river drops  and forms the Shivanasamudra Falls, India's second largest waterfall. The falls are made up of two rapids called Gagana Chukki and Bhara Chukki. The river converges after the falls and passes through the Mekedatu gorge.

The river enters Tamil Nadu through the Dharmapuri district and meanders until the Hogenakkal Falls. From there, it flows towards the town of Salem and enters the Stanley Reservoir in Mettur, where the Mettur Dam was constructed in 1934. After passing the reservoir, the Bhavani River, a main right bank tributary, joins with the Kaveri River.

The river then enters the Tiruchirappalli district and eventually splits into two branches, the northern part is called the Kollidam River or Coleroon, and the southern part of the river retains the name Kaveri.  After flowing for  the two rivers converge and form the Srirangam Island, and then further branches off into 36 different channels. The river travels  before emptying into the Bay of Bengal.

Tributaries 
The Kaveri River has 29 major tributaries and its main tributaries include Harangi, Hemavati, Lakshmana Tirtha, Kabini, Suvarnavathi, Shimsha, Arkavati, Sarabanga, Bhavani, Noyyal, Thirumanimutharu and the Amaravati.

Geology 
The Kaveri basin was formed in the Late Jurassic to Early Cretaceous period during Gondwana breakup and opening of the Indian Ocean. Most of the Kaveri basin is made up of Precambrian rocks. The two major rock types that are found are metamorphic and igneous rocks. Closepet granite is found in the upper parts of the Kaveri basin and Charnockite rocks are only found in the central part.

Kaveri impact structure 
A 2017 paper proposed that an impact structure was present in the vicinity of the Kaveri river.

Ecology 
In Karnataka the riparian zone of the Kaveri basin is made up of two sub-zones, forest and agro-ecosystem. Over half of the basin is arable and the most cultivated crops are rice and sugarcane. The Kaveri basin also has a variety of flora. Some of the major species that occur in the basin include Terminalia arjuna, Tamarindus indica, Pongamia pinnata, Salix tetrasperma, Ficus benghalensis, Ficus religiosa, Eucalyptus torticornis, and Diospyros montana.

The Ranganthittu Bird Sanctuary is located on the Kaveri River. It is a designated Ramsar site that supports many bird species including the painted stork (Mycteria leucocephala), spot-billed pelican (Pelecanus philippensis), and black-headed ibis (Threskiornis melanocephalus). It is also home to the mugger crocodile (Crocodylus palustris), smooth-coated otter (Lutrogale perspicillata), and hump-backed mahseer (Tor remadevii).

Religious significance 
In Hinduism, the Kaveri River is considered one of seven holy rivers in India. There are many stories narrated in the Puranas about the origin of Kaveri as a river and a goddess. The Skanda Purana narrates that during the Samudra Manthana, or churning of the Ocean of Milk, Mohini and Lopamudra retrieved the nectar of immortality for the gods. Afterwards, Mohini became a cave in the Brahmagiri hills and Brahma took care of Lopamudra as his daughter. Later, Brahma offered Lopamudra to king Kavera, who was childless, as he was pleased by king Kavera's devotion. Lopamudra was then renamed as Kaveri. When Kaveri grew up she prayed to Brahma to transform her into a purifying river.

In another legend, Lopamudra becomes sage Agastya's wife and takes on a form of water during a severe drought in south India. Sage Agastya carries her in his small brass water pot on his journey to the south. Arriving on a hill, he places the water pot on the ground, but Ganesha, in the form of crow, knocks the water pot down. The spilled water runs down the hill and onto the drought-stricken land.

Irrigation
The primary uses of the Kaveri is providing water for irrigation, water for household consumption and the generation of electricity.  

The hydroelectric plant built on the left of Sivanasamudra Falls on the Kaveri in 1902 was the first hydroelectric plant in Asia.

The Krishna Raja Sagara Dam has a capacity of 49 tmc ft. and the Mettur Dam which creates Stanley Reservoir has a capacity of 93.4 tmc ft. (thousand million cubic ft)

In August 2003, inflow into reservoirs in Karnataka was at a 29-year low, with a 58% shortfall. Water stored in Krishna Raja Sagara amounted to only 4.6 tmc ft.

In February 2020, Tamil Nadu assembly passed bill to declare Cauvery Delta as Protected Agricultural Zone, includes Thanjavur, Thirvarur, Nagapattinam and five blocks in Cuddalore and Pudukottai. The bill does not include Tiruchirappalli, Ariyalur and Karur which are geographically included in the Cauvery Delta.

Water sharing 

The dispute over the sharing of Kaveri River began in 1807 when the Madras Government objected to Mysore State's plans for the development of irrigation projects. After initial discussions failed between the two Governments, Mysore asked the Government of India to intervene. Discussions were held again which led to a six rule agreement called General Agreement of 1892. On 16 February 2018, the Indian Supreme Court said that Karnataka will get 284.75 tmc ft, Tamil Nadu will get 404.25 tmc ft, Kerala will get 30 tmc ft and Puducherry will get 7 tmc ft. 10 tmc ft will be reserved for Environmental Protection and 4 tmc ft will be reserved for Inevitable Wastage into the Sea.

Acting on the Supreme Court's direction, the Centre constituted a Cauvery Water Management Authority (CWMA) on 1 June 2018 to address the dispute over sharing of river water among Tamil Nadu, Karnataka, Kerala and Puducherry. The central government failed to adhere with the top court's deadline of within six weeks of deliverance of judgement.

On 16 February 2018, the apex court had directed the government to form the CWMA within six weeks in a verdict that marginally increased Karnataka's share of Cauvery water, reduced the allocation for Tamil Nadu and sought to settle the protracted water dispute between the two states.

On 22 June 2018, despite opposition from Karnataka, the Central government constituted the Cauvery Water Regulation Committee (CWRC) as per the provisions in the Kaveri Management Scheme laid down by the Supreme Court.

See also 
 List of rivers of India
 Kaveri Pushkaram

References

External links 

 Cauvery.com (presentation on the Cavery River)
 Kaveri Pushkaralu (archived 2 August 2018)
 Kaveri Pushkaram 2017 (archived 24 September 2018)

 
Rivers of Tamil Nadu
Rivers of Karnataka
Ancient Indian rivers
Sacred rivers
Coromandel Coast
Rivers of India
Rivers in Buddhism